The 2018 Sofia Open (also known as 2018 DIEMA XTRA Sofia Open for sponsorship reasons) was a tennis tournament played on indoor hard courts. It was the 3rd edition of the Sofia Open as part of the ATP World Tour 250 series of the 2018 ATP World Tour. It took place at the Arena Armeec in Sofia, Bulgaria, from February 5–11.

Points and prize money

Point distribution

Prize money

Singles main-draw entrants

Seeds

1 Rankings as of January 29, 2018

Other entrants 
The following players received wildcards into the singles main draw:
  Adrian Andreev
  Alexander Donski
  Dimitar Kuzmanov

The following players received entry from the qualifying draw:
  Mirza Bašić
  Ernests Gulbis
  Martin Kližan
  Jozef Kovalík

The following players received entry as a lucky loser:
  Salvatore Caruso
  Florian Mayer

Withdrawals 
Before the tournament
  Grigor Dimitrov (shoulder injury) →replaced by  Stan Wawrinka
  Matthew Ebden →replaced by  Florian Mayer
  Chung Hyeon (blisters) →replaced by  Blaž Kavčič
  Filip Krajinović →replaced by  Marcos Baghdatis
  Mikhail Kukushkin →replaced by  Salvatore Caruso
  Lu Yen-hsun →replaced by  Malek Jaziri

Doubles main-draw entrants

Seeds 

 1 Rankings are as of January 29, 2018.

Other entrants 
The following pairs received wildcards into the doubles main draw:
  Alexander Donski /  Alexandar Lazov 
  Dimitar Kuzmanov /  Vasko Mladenov

The following pair received entry as alternates:
  Radoslav Shandarov /  Vasil Shandarov

Withdrawals 
Before the tournament
  Mikhail Kukushkin

Champions

Singles 

  Mirza Bašić def.  Marius Copil, 7–6(8–6), 6–7(4–7), 6–4

Doubles 

  Robin Haase /  Matwé Middelkoop def.  Nikola Mektić /  Alexander Peya, 5–7, 6–4, [10–4]

External links 
Official website
Tournament page at ATPWorldTour.com

References 

Sofia Open
Sofia Open
Sofia Open
Sofia Open